Lin or LIN may refer to:

People
Lin (surname) (normally ), a Chinese surname
Lin (The King of Fighters), Chinese assassin character
Lin Chow Bang, character in Fat Pizza

Places
Lin, Iran, a village in Mazandaran Province
Lin, Korçë, village in Pogradec municipality, Albania
Lin County, Henan, now Linzhou, China
Lin County, Shanxi, in China
Lincolnshire, Chapman code LIN

Transport
 Linate Airport, Milan, Italy
 Linlithgow railway station, West Lothian, Scotland

Other uses
 LIN Media, a US TV broadcaster
 Lingala language, a Bantu language of central Africa
 Local Interconnect Network, for vehicle computers
 lin., an abbreviation for linear

See also
 Linn (disambiguation)
 Lyn (disambiguation)
 Lynn (given name)

Chinese given names
Burmese names
Unisex given names